Karina Ildor Jacobsgaard (born 1 January 1980) is a Danish former tennis player.
 
In her career, she won three singles titles and one doubles title on the ITF Circuit. On 27 May 2002, she reached her best singles ranking of world No. 432. On 20 May 2002, she peaked at No. 463 in the WTA doubles rankings.

Jacobsgaard has a 13–25 record for Denmark in Fed Cup competition.

ITF Circuit finals

Singles: 5 (3 titles, 2 runner-ups)

Doubles: 6 (1 title, 5 runner-ups)

References

External links
 
 
 

1980 births
Living people
Danish female tennis players